Amaroo Park Raceway was a  motor racing circuit located in Annangrove, New South Wales, in the present-day north-western suburbs of Sydney, Australia. Opened in 1967, the road circuit served as a venue for a variety of competitions including the Castrol 6 Hour motorcycle race, rounds of the Australian Touring Car Championship, Australian Drivers' Championship, Australian Formula Ford Championship, Australian Sports Sedan Championship, the AMSCAR Series for touring cars, historic racing and others. The last Australian Touring Car Championship round to take place at the circuit was in 1994.

From 1970, Amaroo Park was run and promoted by the Australian Racing Drivers Club (ARDC) who also promoted the Mount Panorama Circuit in Bathurst, and later were the promoters of Sydney's Eastern Creek Raceway.

The ARDC lost money promoting the Super Touring Bathurst 1000 from 1997 to 1999 and this circuit was sold to recover some of the loss.

History

Amaroo Park was built by Industrialist Oscar Glaser as part of a plan to build a full motorsport complex. This began with a hillclimb track, as well as a dirt short track, a motocross track, a little used speedway track, and finally the main (relatively short) 1.8km bitumen track. A full length Grand Prix circuit was planned but never built. The name Amaroo comes from the Aboriginal word meaning beautiful place.

The first motorcycle meeting was held on 26 February with a 30 lap production race won by Larry Simons on a BSA Mk.ll Spitfire in heavy rain.

The official opening meeting, promoted by the Amaroo Sporting Country Club, was held on 12 March 1967 with attendance restricted to members of several motoring clubs, around 1000 spectators visiting. The first event open to the general public was held on 9 April. More events followed, however poor spectator attendances blamed in part on poor facilities lead to the temporary closure of the circuit in mid 1968. 

The circuit reopened on 31 May 1970 with much improved spectator facilities and racing now run by the ARDC,  with the first of the motorcycle endurance races which came to be known as the Castrol Six Hour run by the Willoughby District Motorcycle Club later that year.

Amaroo Park held its own touring car series from 1971 to 1993, initially as the Sun-7 Chesterfield Series and then under various names, including the "AMSCAR Series" from 1982.

The complex had a hillclimb, a motocross track, a little used speedway track and a short circuit track.

The circuit closed forever after the last meeting was held there on 23 August 1998. The meeting was billed as the "Goodbye Amaroo State open Meeting" with a mix of classes including Sports Sedans, HQ's and Group N Historic Touring Cars. The final race held at Amaroo Park was a "Butchers Picnic" which included the top 3 cars from the competing classes all in one final race. The race was run as a Butchers Picnic as a salute to the very first meetings at the circuit where the first races run were indeed Butchers' Picnics. The race, called "The Last Race, The Main Event, Amaroo's Final Fling" started at 4:30pm and was held over 10 laps. It was won by Sydney driver Ray Lintott driving a 4WD, twin-turbo Porsche 911 Turbo with a race time of 9:16.4942. The final driver, Andrew Papadopoulos driving an Alfa Romeo GTV, crossed the line at 4:40pm bringing the curtain down on one of Australia's most popular race circuits after over 31 years of continuous operation. The ARDC also let Arthur Hayes, their #1 member (meaning he was card holder #1) wave the chequered flag for the race.

A Lap of Amaroo Park

Amaroo Park started on the short pit straight, and from there the track had a kink to the right up towards Bitupave Hill. The track then turned left and dropped down into the right hand Dunlop Loop and onto the back straight which again kinked to the right and led into the tight left hander at Honda Corner. Prior to 1983, Honda Corner had no runoff on the inside of the track and was earth banking surrounded by a concrete wall. After the turn at Honda, there was another short right hand kink leading up to the tight right hand Stop Corner (sometimes called the Lake Corner). From there it was a short straight up to Wunderlich Corner, with the pit entry on the outside of the turn. Known as Wunderlich for sponsorship reasons, the turn was known during the 1970s as Ron Hodgson Corner due to sponsorship from Sydney's then largest Holden dealer, was the final turn on the circuit and led back onto the pit straight.

Dunlop Loop, Honda and the Stop Corner were generally regarded as the best passing spots on the track.

At its closing the outright lap record for the 1.94 km circuit was 0:44.36, set by John Bowe in 1987 driving a 5.8L Chevrolet powered Veskanda C1 sports car.

Australian Touring Car Championship
Amaroo Park first held a round of the Australian Touring Car Championship when it hosted Round 4 of the 1974 Australian Touring Car Championship. The race was won by Peter Brock driving a Holden Dealer Team Holden LJ Torana GTR XU-1. The circuit would go on to host 15 rounds of the championship between 1974 and its last ATCC round in 1994. The last race was won by Mark Skaife driving his Gibson Motorsport Holden VP Commodore giving Holden the bookends on Amaroo Park's participation in the ATCC.

AMSCAR Series

One of the features of Amaroo Park's history has been the AMSCAR Series for touring cars, created by Amaroo's promoters, the Australian Racing Drivers Club and staged annually from 1982 to 1993. Popular with spectators and easy for Sydney's Channel 7 to telecast, it became the backbone of the Sydney touring car scene, a scene which once consisted mostly of privateers who have largely disappeared since Amaroo closed, with the major touring car teams now operating from Melbourne and south-east Queensland. On many occasions these events featured larger grid numbers than did the rounds of the national level Australian Touring Car Championship. This was mostly as the large number of Sydney privateers who usually filled the grid in the nationally televised (by Ch.7) Bathurst 1000, rarely raced outside of NSW or Queensland due to limited budgets.

The AMSCAR Series had its origins in Amaroo's own Sun-7 Chesterfield Series for touring cars, first held in 1971 and was won by Sydney's Lakis Manticas driving a Morris Cooper S. This would continue, under various names relating to series sponsorship, through to 1981. It was only from the beginning of the "Group A" category in Australia in 1985 that the headline teams started appearing in the series on a more regular basis, with part of the reason being that as Group A was new to Australia in 1985, the AMSCAR Series gave teams valuable testing under race conditions (also because from 1985 Amaroo would hold an annual round of the ATCC). 

Frank Gardner's JPS Team BMW and its drivers Jim Richards and Tony Longhurst dominated from 1985 to 1987 (Richards in the 635 CSi was unbeaten at Amaroo in 1985 winning all 12 AMSCAR races, the ATCC round and the Endurance Championship race), while Gibson Motorsport, first with Nissan and later with Holden, also contested the series in the later years of Group A and into the new 5.0L V8 formula introduced in 1993, with Jim Richards winning in the team's Nissan Skyline GT-R in 1992 while Mark Skaife won for Gibson driving a Holden VP Commodore in 1993. Other top line teams to contest the AMSCAR series after the switch to Group A were Peter Brock's Holden Dealer Team (later known as Mobil 1 Racing), Dick Johnson Racing, 1988 series winner Colin Bond's Caltex CXT Racing Team, Tony Longhurst's Benson & Hedges team (evolved from JPS Team BMW), as well as Robbie Francevic's Volvo team.
The increasing national popularity of the Australian Touring Car Championship, improvements in Channel 7's ATCC telecast, and the 1991 economic recession which saw a number of privateer teams only racing in the two ATCC rounds in Sydney and the Bathurst 1000, all gradually reduced the grids until the AMSCAR Series was discontinued after the 1993 season. It was revived in 1997 and held at the ARDC's two circuits, Amaroo Park and Eastern Creek, but with the major teams holding exclusivity to V8 Supercar events, the mostly Sydney-based privateers were not numerous enough to make the series viable and the series folded after 1997.

Amaroo Park 300
Between 1980 and 1987, Amaroo Park ran what was usually the second endurance race of the touring car season (the Adelaide International Raceway endurance race usually preceded it by two weeks), though it was not until 1983 that it became a round of the Australian Endurance Championship.

The races were held over 155 laps of the 1.94 km (1.20 mi) circuit for a total of 300.7 km (186 mi). The 1984 Silastic 300 was the only race held under wet conditions. The final race in 1987 was known as the Hardie Irrigation 100 due to the distance being shortened to 100 laps rather than the usual 155.

Amaroo Park 300 Winners

National championship rounds
Rounds of various Australian motor racing championship were held at the circuit.

Australian Drivers' Championship

* Amaroo hosted two rounds of the 1989 Australian Drivers' Championship (both held on the same day). Neil Crompton won Round 7 and Simon Kane won Round 8.

Australian Formula 2 Championship

Australian Sports Car Championship

Australian Sports Sedan Championship

Lap records

The official fastest race lap records at the Amaroo Park are listed as:

References

External links

Former Supercars Championship circuits
Sports venues in Sydney
Defunct motorsport venues in Australia
Motorsport venues in New South Wales
1967 establishments in Australia
Sports venues completed in 1967
1998 disestablishments in Australia